"Foxtrot Uniform Charlie Kilo" is a song by American alternative rock band Bloodhound Gang. It was released as the lead single from their fourth studio album, Hefty Fine (2005), on August 1, 2005. The song was written by band members Jimmy Pop and Jared Hasselhoff. The title "Foxtrot Uniform Charlie Kilo" spells out f-u-c-k in the NATO phonetic alphabet. The song's lyrics consist of various sexual euphemisms.

Music video
The music video for "Foxtrot Uniform Charlie Kilo" was directed by Marc Klasfeld. It shows Bam Margera, a friend of the band, driving down a Pennsylvania highway in the "Banana Car" (which was seen on the MTV Cribs episode in which the band appeared). While he is driving, he sees some girls performing sexually suggestive activities in wet bikinis, poking fun at Benny Benassi's controversial "Satisfaction" video, while the band performs in a tunnel. The girls are wearing hard hats with the Pennsylvania National Guard insignia.

When Margera drives the banana-mobile up to the tunnel (whose entrance is topped by a wild grapevine growing in the shape of trimmed female pubic hair), he proceeds to gaze, enthralled at it, then drives through it. The tunnel used in the video is the abandoned Rays Hill Tunnel on a 12-mile stretch of abandoned Pennsylvania Turnpike east of Breezewood. The video ends with Margera giving a banana to a man in a Speedo who consumes it in a manner that mimics fellatio. The video also features Mark the Bagger at the very beginning saying "Fish don't fry in the kitchen".

Charts

Weekly charts

Year-end charts

Release history

References

2005 singles
2005 songs
Bloodhound Gang songs
Geffen Records singles
Music videos directed by Marc Klasfeld
Republic Records singles
Songs written by Jimmy Pop